Poniente Almeriense is a comarca in Almería, Spain. It is sometimes also known as the "sea of plastic" (Mar de plástico) due to the numerous greenhouses that cover the area. The comarca contains ten municipalities (the tenth, Balanegra, was created in 2015 from part of Berja municipality) and 259,357 inhabitants in an area of 971 km2. The "sea of plastic" was one of the subjects of We feed the world, a 2005 documentary; and the setting of Spanish crime drama Mar de plástico.

The typical agricultural products of the greenhouses are: cucumbers, watermelons, eggplants, zucchinis, peaches, peppers and tomatoes.

The comarca borders the Alboran Sea to the South, the city of Almería to the east, the Sierra de Gádor to the north, and the municipality of Albuñol (in Granada province) to the west.

Municipalities
The Poniente Almeriense contains the following ten municipalities:

Note: + an additional municipality, Balanegra, was created in 2015 from part of Berja municipality.

References

External links
 Las Norias de Daza - Google maps
 Greenhouses of the Campo de Dalías, Almería Province, Spain - NASA Earth Observatory
 Southeastern Spain's Greenhouse Landscape: Plastic over Sand-Beds.

Comarcas of Andalusia
Geography of the Province of Almería